The 1959–60 Denver Pioneers men's ice hockey team represented University of Denver in college ice hockey. In its 4th year under head coach Murray Armstrong the team compiled a 27–4–3 record and reached the NCAA tournament for the second time. The Pioneers defeated Michigan Tech 5–3 in the championship game at the Boston Arena in Boston, Massachusetts. Denver set a record for the most wins by a team in one season, breaking the previous high of 25 set by Colorado College in 1956–57.

Season
After Denver was left out of the 1959 NCAA Tournament despite having the best record of any NCAA team at 22-5-1, the Pioneers knew they had to make changes. First, the argument between Denver and Minnesota over recruiting practices (teenage Americans vs. overage Canadians) was not settled but was put to the side. As part of a compromise between the two Minnesota would agree to rejoin with the 4 former WIHL schools so long as they did not have to schedule Denver during the season. The deal was eventually struck where they would play the Pioneers during the 1959–60 season but were not required to afterwards (Minnesota would not play Denver outside of playoff meetings until 1972). That settlement allowed all seven schools to rejoin in the new WCHA which improved upon the previous conference principally by introducing the first official conference tournament in college hockey history. The second improvement came from counting all league games equally in the standings; rather than have a total of four points available between each pair of teams. The WCHA sorted their unbalanced schedule based on winning percentage.

Being in a conference once more also settled the second problem Denver had faced the year before; playing away games. Denver had only once left Colorado the year before and lost both games on the road. For 1959–60 they began the season with a compressed road trip where they played six games over a nine-day period. The trip started out well with Denver tying Minnesota 4–4 in the team's only overtime game all season before winning the following night. Two days later they were hosted by Michigan Tech and dropped both games to a very strong team. With no time to lick their wounds the Pioneers got one day off to travel to North Dakota and take on the defending national champion Fighting Sioux. The Pioneers redeemed themselves by winning both games comfortably and pulling back above .500.

After a 9-day break Denver opened its home schedule and thoroughly dominated the previous year's runner-up Michigan State by a combined score of 21-1. Those two games could have set the tone for the rest of Denver's season but the very next week they invited Michigan Tech to Denver and after winning the first game easily they lost their third game of the year to the Huskies and slipped to 6–3–1 in the WCHA. Similar to their last series against MTU, Denver got one day off before hosting Minnesota and avenged their loss with two 5-goal wins over the Golden Gophers. After winning two games against a visiting senior team Denver ended the first half of their conference schedule by splitting a pair of games against North Dakota. Denver found themselves sitting atop the WCHA at the end of January with a 9-4-1 record and were in prime position to earn the top seed in the WCHA tournament.

Denver began February playing a series of games against several national teams who were preparing to play in the Olympics at the end of the month along with Colorado College. After starting with a non-conference win over CC Denver defeated the eventual gold medalist US National Team and then tied them the following day. Two days later they tied the powerhouse Soviet National Team before defeating both West Germany and Sweden.

Once the Olympics began Denver returned to its conference schedule, winning both games of a home-and-home against Colorado College before hitting the road for a second time. On this trip they ended up playing two series in five days against Michigan and Michigan State and won all four games. After returning home and winning a second series against the CC Tigers Denver ended with a 23-4-3 record and won the inaugural WCHA championship.

Denver received the top seed in the WCHA Tournament which, rather than acting as a traditional tournament, had two 2-game series played between the top four teams to determine the two WCHA co-champions. The two series were total goal affairs rather than being best-of contests so when Denver opened against Colorado College with a 9–2 victory they would have to lose the succeeding game by 8 goals to miss out on the NCAA tournament. Unsurprisingly it was a much more defensive effort from the regular season champions and the Pioneers scored only three times on the night but was still able win the game and were joined by Michigan Tech as the inaugural WCHA Tournament co-champions.

As the better of the two teams Denver was given the top western seed in the NCAA tournament and opened against Boston University who were playing in their home building. Despite the mostly partisan crowd rooting them on, BU was unable to overcome the best offense in the nation and surrendered six goals to Denver who advanced to their second championship game. Denver was met in the final by their nemesis Michigan Tech and began the game at a conservative pace. Denver scored the first goal of the game just after the 10-minute mark and took another 22 minutes before the got their second. With the Pioneers holding a 2-0 advantage the Huskies came to life at the end of the second and scored three times in under five minutes to take their first lead of the game. After George Konik tied the game two and a half minutes into the third Denver was able to quell the MTU offense for the remainder of the period, holding the Huskies to only six shots. The Pioneers continued firing the puck at George Cuculick and with just over a minutes to go in regulation team captain John MacMillan scored the winning goal in his final college game. Just for good measure he added an empty-net goal 50 seconds later that sealed the game for Denver and sent the Pioneers to the top of the podium for the second time.

Because the entire tournament had been played fairly evenly the voters could not decide on one person to win the MOP so for the first (and only as of 2018) time the award was split, going to three players but none of whom belonged to the national champion. Instead Denver had to settle for only two of the six spots on the All-Tournament first team in the form of Marty Howe and George Konik while John MacMillan and goaltender George Kirkwood were placed on the second team.

Howe, Konik and Bill Masterton were named to the AHCA All-American West Team while Kirkwood, Howe and Masterton received All-WCHA First Team nods. While Konik and MacMillan found themselves on the WCHA second team Kirkwood was named as the top sophomore in the WCHA (along with MTU's Lou Angotti) and set the record for more wins a season by a goaltender with 27.

Standings

Schedule

|-
!colspan=12 style="color:white; background:#862633; " | Exhibition

|-
!colspan=12 style="color:white; background:#862633; " | Regular Season

|-
!colspan=12 style="color:white; background:#862633; " | 

|-
!colspan=12 style="color:white; background:#862633; " |

Roster and scoring statistics

Dick Jabob was a member of the team but did not participate in any of their games and was not awarded a jersey number.

Goaltending Statistics

1960 championship game

W1 Denver vs. W2 Michigan Tech

Notes
After graduating in 1960, John MacMillan was signed by the Toronto Maple Leafs and became the first Denver alumnus to play in the NHL. Though his career was short he would end up winning two Stanley cups. several years after MacMillan's retirement George Konik and Bill Masterton would make their NHL debuts in the 1967–68 season. While Konik would play 51 games for Pittsburgh before returning to the minors, Masterton became the only player in the history of professional North American sports to die as a direct result of injuries sustained in a game.

References

Denver Pioneers men's ice hockey seasons
Denver
Denver
Denver
Denver
Denver
Denver